Tigran Gharamian (born 24 July 1984) is an Armenian-French chess grandmaster. He won the French Chess Championship in 2018.

Chess career
Gharamian played for Armenia in the Children's Chess Olympiads of 1999 and 2000.

He came first at Fourmies 2007 and Charleroi 2007. In 2010 he tied for 1st–3rd with Vadim Malakhatko and Deep Sengupta in the 24th Open Pierre and Vacances. In 2011 he won the Vandœuvre-lès-Nancy Open and tied for 2nd–4th with Alexander Kovchan, Boris Grachev and Ante Brkić in the Open Master Tournament in Biel. Gharamian tied for 1st–5th with Pentala Harikrishna, Parimarjan Negi, Tornike Sanikidze and Martyn Kravtsiv in the Cappelle-la-Grande Open 2012. He won the French Chess Championship in 2018.

References

External links

1984 births
Living people
Sportspeople from Yerevan
Chess grandmasters
Armenian chess players
French chess players